SustyVibes is a nonprofit organization consisting of youth groups that are focused on environmental and climate action. With the support of volunteers, it carries out campaigns and projects across several states in Nigeria and Ghana.

Campaigns and projects performed by SustyVibes are centered on global and regional issues such as climate change, climate and mental health, plastic pollution, eco-feminism, youth development, and sustainability popular culture. SustyVibes  (abbreviation for Sustainability Vibes) operates out of Lagos, Nigeria.

SustyVibes has over 700 members and volunteers (referred to as 'SustyVibers').

Among the initiatives carried out by SustyVibes groups are tree planting, community clean-ups, and educational workshops on renewable energy and sustainable living.

In addition to its community-based programs, SustyVibes conducts research and advocacy work to raise awareness about environmental issues in Nigeria and suggests solutions for addressing them. The organization has partnered with other NGOs and government agencies on various initiatives.

In 2022, SustyVibes founder Jennifer Uchendu attended the 2022 United Nations Climate Change Conference in Sharm El Sheikh, Egypt. In 2022, Uchendu was named one of the 'Top 20 Young Women in Sustainable Development' by Young Women in Sustainable Development.

References

External links 

 Official website  

Non-profit organizations based in Lagos
Environmental organizations based in Africa
Climate change
Sustainability advocates